Education in the Basque Autonomous Community is entirely free from the age of 3, and compulsory between 6 and 16 years. The majority of students are educated in the Basque language.

Levels of schooling
Infant education
For children aged 3 years, and is available at a subsidised cost.

Infant education
For children aged 3–6 years, and is both free and optional.

Primary education
For children aged 6–12 years, and is compulsory and free.

Secondary education
For children aged 12–16 years, it is compulsory. Upon completion of this level of schooling, students with satisfactory grades have the option to continue their education for two additional years. Students will either pursue academic study in preparation for university entrance examinations, or follow a professional training course. Those who fall short of the satisfactory grades may attend professional initiation programmes as a precursor to entering the job market.

Higher education
In addition to many institutions which specialise in vocational training, the Basque country boasts 4 universities. The public University of the Basque Country and the Jesuit-owned private University of Deusto are two of Spain's most prestigious. 
The Opus Dei-governed University of Navarre has a campus in San Sebastian.
The newest one is the University of Mondragón, part of Mondragón Corporación Cooperativa.

Ikastolak
In the mid- to late 1960s, Basque language schools began to spring up all over the Southern Basque Country starting in nurseries and primary education. The new autonomous community of the Basque Country was granted autonomous powers with regard to education following the death of Franco in 1975, and the option of an education entirely in Basque in schools called ikastolak took a legal status. There are four types of school differentiated by their linguistic teaching models:

X -   0.6% of students. Education is entirely in Spanish.
A - 26.2% of students. Education is entirely in Spanish, with Basque as a compulsory subject.
B - 23.0%. Education is partly in Basque, partly in Spanish (usually mathematics and reading/writing).
D - 50.2%. Education entirely in Basque, with Spanish as a compulsory subject.

See also
 Education in Spain
 Euskal Herriak Bere Eskola

External links
 Basque Education System

Education in the Basque Country (autonomous community)